These are the international rankings of Ecuador.

Demographics
Immigrant population in Ecuador ranked 119.

Technology
In innovation and technology Ecuador ranks 96th.

Economy

Foreign exchange reserves: not in top 80 worldwide. The government's deposits are “extremely low.” 
International Monetary Fund: 2009 List of countries by GDP (nominal) per capita ranked 88
International Monetary Fund: 2009 List of countries by GDP (nominal) ranked 65
Ecuador ranks 71st in Global Competitiveness

Environment

2012 Happy Planet Index ranked 23
Yale University and Columbia University: 2010 Environmental Performance Index ranked 30

Globalization

2007 KOF Index of Globalization  ranked 63 
2013 Global Innovation ranked 83

Military

Institute for Economics and Peace/Economist Intelligence Unit: Global Peace Index 2009, ranked 109

Politics

Economist Intelligence Unit: Democracy Index 2008, ranked 88
Heritage Foundation & Wall Street Journal: 2010 Index of Economic Freedom ranked 147
Reporters Without Borders Press Freedom Index 2013, ranked 119
Transparency International Corruption Perceptions Index 2009, ranked 146 out of 180 countries

Society
Economist Intelligence Unit: Quality-of-life index 2005, ranked 52
Homicide rate ranked 12 most homicides per capita in the world

Other
Institute for Economics and Peace/Economist Intelligence Unit: Global Peace Index 2009, ranked 109 
Transparency International Corruption Perceptions Index 2009, ranked 146 out of 180 countries

References

Ecuador